The Maniac Cook is a 1909 American silent short drama film directed by D. W. Griffith.

Cast
 Anita Hendrie as Margie, the Cook
 Marion Leonard as Mrs. Holland
 Harry Solter as Mr. Holland
 Clara T. Bracy
 George Gebhardt as Policeman
 David Miles
 Mack Sennett as Policeman

References

External links
 

1909 films
1909 drama films
Silent American drama films
American silent short films
American black-and-white films
Films directed by D. W. Griffith
1909 short films
1900s American films